Training Pigeons is a 1936 Fleischer Studios animated short film featuring Betty Boop and Pudgy the Pup.

Plot summary
Betty and Pudgy are on the roof of their tenement building, trying to get her pet pigeons back in their cage. One stubborn bird refuses to return to the roost, despite Betty's pleas. Pudgy, imagining himself a might hunting dog, attempts to catch the bird, with little success (at one point, Pudgy spots the pigeon on top of a flag pole, and as he tries to climb up the pole, the flag spanks Pudgy). When the pigeon gives Pudgy the slip, the little dog eventually wanders into the forest, where he falls asleep from exhaustion. The pigeon takes pity on Pudgy, and flies him back to Betty's home. When Pudgy wakes up on the roof, he tears up the picture of the hunting dog in frustration.

References

External links
 Training Pigeons on YouTube.
 Training Pigeons at the Big Cartoon Database.
 

1936 films
Betty Boop cartoons
1930s American animated films
American black-and-white films
1936 animated films
Paramount Pictures short films
Fleischer Studios short films
Animated films about birds
Short films directed by Dave Fleischer
Animated films about dogs